The 2022 Copa Sudamericana final stages were played from 28 June to 1 October 2022. A total of 16 teams competed in the final stages to decide the champions of the 2022 Copa Sudamericana, with the final played in Córdoba, Argentina at the Estadio Mario Alberto Kempes.

Qualified teams
The winners of each of the eight groups in the Copa Sudamericana group stage as well as the third-placed teams of each of the eight groups in the Copa Libertadores group stage advanced to the round of 16.

Copa Sudamericana group stage winners

Copa Libertadores group stage third-placed teams

Seeding

Starting from the round of 16, the teams are seeded according to their results in the group stage, with the Copa Sudamericana group winners (Pot 1) seeded 1–8, and the Copa Libertadores group third-placed teams (Pot 2) seeded 9–16.

Format

Starting from the round of 16, the teams play a single-elimination tournament with the following rules:
In the round of 16, quarter-finals and semi-finals, each tie is played on a home-and-away two-legged basis, with the higher-seeded team hosting the second leg (Regulations Article 2.2.3). If tied on aggregate, extra time will not be played, and a penalty shoot-out will be used to determine the winners (Regulations Article 2.4.4).
The final is played as a single match at a venue pre-selected by CONMEBOL, with the higher-seeded team designated as the "home" team for administrative purposes (Regulations Article 2.2.6). If tied after regulation, 30 minutes of extra time will be played. If still tied after extra time, a penalty shoot-out will be used to determine the winners (Regulations Article 2.4.5).

Draw

The draw for the round of 16 was held on 27 May 2022, 12:00 PYT (UTC−4) at the CONMEBOL Convention Center in Luque, Paraguay. For the round of 16, the 16 teams were drawn into eight ties (A–H) between a Copa Sudamericana group winner (Pot 1) and a Copa Libertadores group third-placed team (Pot 2), with the group winners hosting the second leg. Teams from the same association or the same group could be drawn into the same tie (Regulations Article 2.2.3.2).

Bracket
The bracket starting from the round of 16 is determined as follows:

The bracket was decided based on the round of 16 draw, which was held on 27 May 2022.

Round of 16
The first legs were played on 28–30 June, and the second legs were played on 5–7 July 2022.

|}

Match A

Tied 2–2 on aggregate, Deportivo Táchira won on penalties and advanced to the quarter-finals (Match S1).

Match B

Nacional won 4–1 on aggregate and advanced to the quarter-finals (Match S2).

Match C

São Paulo won 8–3 on aggregate and advanced to the quarter-finals (Match S3).

Match D

Internacional won 4–3 on aggregate and advanced to the quarter-finals (Match S4).

Match E

Melgar won 2–1 on aggregate and advanced to the quarter-finals (Match S4).

Match F

Ceará won 5–1 on aggregate and advanced to the quarter-finals (Match S3).

Match G

Tied 2–2 on aggregate, Atlético Goianiense won on penalties and advanced to the quarter-finals (Match S2).

Match H

Independiente del Valle won 2–1 on aggregate and advanced to the quarter-finals (Match S1).

Quarter-finals
The first legs were played on 2–4 August, and the second legs were played on 9–11 August 2022.

|}

Match S1

Independiente del Valle won 5–1 on aggregate and advanced to the semi-finals (Match F1).

Match S2

Atlético Goianiense won 4–0 on aggregate and advanced to the semi-finals (Match F2).

Match S3

Tied 2–2 on aggregate, São Paulo won on penalties and advanced to the semi-finals (Match F2).

Match S4

Tied 0–0 on aggregate, Melgar won on penalties and advanced to the semi-finals (Match F1).

Semi-finals
The first legs were played on 31 August and 1 September, and the second legs were played on 7 and 8 September 2022.

|}

Match F1

Independiente del Valle won 6–0 on aggregate and advanced to the final.

Match F2

Tied 3–3 on aggregate, São Paulo won on penalties and advanced to the final.

Final

The final was played on 1 October 2022 at Estadio Mario Alberto Kempes in Córdoba.

Notes

References

External links
CONMEBOL Sudamericana 2022, CONMEBOL.com
CONMEBOL Sudamericana

3
June 2022 sports events in South America
July 2022 sports events in South America
August 2022 sports events in South America
September 2022 sports events in South America
October 2022 sports events in South America